Sajnekhali Wildlife Sanctuary is a 362 km2 area in the northern part of the Sundarbans delta in South 24 Parganas district, West Bengal, India. It is located at the confluence of the Matla and Gumdi rivers. The area is mainly mangrove scrub, forest and swamp. It was set up as a sanctuary in 1976. It is home to a rich population of different species of wildlife, such as water fowl, heron, pelican, spotted deer, rhesus macaques, wild boar, tigers, water monitor lizards, fishing cats, otters, Olive ridley turtle, crocodiles, Batagur terrapins, and migratory birds. The ideal place for nature lovers to observe wild animals from a height is the Sajnekhali Watchtower.

Transport 
Sajnekhali is situated 130 km from Kolkata. Canning is the nearest railway station of it. Ferry service towards Sajnekhali is available from Gosaba. Rented boat or motor launch can be hired for Basanti or Gadkhali.

Gallery

References

External links

 Sajnekhali Wildlife Sanctuary Wild Bengal Wildlife Sanctuaries

Wildlife sanctuaries in West Bengal
Geography of South 24 Parganas district
Sundarbans
Protected areas established in 1976
Tourist attractions in South 24 Parganas district
1976 establishments in West Bengal